The New England District is one of the 35 districts of the Lutheran Church–Missouri Synod (LCMS), and encompasses all six New England states: Maine, New Hampshire, Vermont, Massachusetts, Rhode Island and Connecticut. In addition, three congregations in southwest Connecticut are in the non-geographic SELC District. The New England District includes approximately 70 congregations and missions, subdivided into 9 circuits, as well as 24 preschools and 5 elementary schools. Baptized membership is over 22,000; with New England's total population standing at 14,240,000 as of 2005, the District's membership represents only 0.16% of the local population – the lowest of any of the LCMS' 33 geographical districts.

The New England District was formed in 1972 out of the Atlantic District. District offices are located in Springfield, Massachusetts. Delegates from each congregation meet in convention every three years in Springfield to elect the district president, vice presidents, circuit counselors, a board of directors, and other officers. The Rev. Timothy Yeadon was elected to his first term as District President at the 16th Regular Convention, June 14–16, 2012, succeeding the Rev. James Keurulainen, who served from 1997-2012. President Yeadon was re-elected at subsequent District Conventions, but died in office on 16 January 2022. He was succeeded as District President by the First Vice President, the Rev. Robert Beinke. Rev. Beinke was then elected to a full term as District President during the New England District Convention of June 2022.

Presidents
Rev. Robert J. Riedel, 1972–1976
Rev. Martin Dienst, 1976–1985
Rev. David Mulder, 1985–1991
Rev. Osmar Lehenbauer, 1991–1997
Rev. James E. Keurulainen, 1997–2012
Rev. Dr. Timothy Yeadon, 2012–2022
Rev. Robert Beinke, 2022–Present

Riedel was among four district presidents who were removed from office by Synod President J. A. O. Preus on April 2, 1976, for non-compliance with synodical directives on the ordination and placement of improperly endorsed ministerial candidates from Seminex.

Riedel (1961–72), Mulder (1981–85), and Lehenbauer (1986–91) had all previously served as pastor at Immanuel Lutheran Church in Bristol, Connecticut.

References

External links
New England District web site
LCMS: New England District
LCMS Congregation Directory

Lutheran Church–Missouri Synod districts
Lutheranism in Connecticut
Lutheranism in Maine
Lutheranism in Massachusetts
Lutheranism in New Hampshire
Lutheranism in Rhode Island
Lutheranism in Vermont
Christian organizations established in 1972
Religion in New England